The Ministry of Foreign Affairs of the Republic of Belarus (BGN/PCGN: Ministerstva zamyezhnykh spraw Respubliki Byelarus’; , BGN/PCGN: Ministerstvo inostrannykh del Respubliki Belarus’) is the Belarusian government ministry which oversees the foreign relations of Belarus.

The current Minister of Foreign Affairs is Sergei Aleinik, since December 2022. Anatoly Glaz, a diplomat and spokesperson of the Ministry, has voiced criticism of international sanctions against the Lukashenko regime and justified bans on foreign journalists from working in Belarus.

History

Historical lineage
In December 1920, the People's Commissariat for Foreign Affairs was established by resolution of the Second Congress of Soviets of Belarus. With the 1922 formation of the USSR, the functions of representing the Soviet republics in the international arena passed into the national jurisdiction. On 1 February 1944, the Supreme Soviet of the USSR adopted a law on giving the Union Republics powers in the field of foreign policy. The People’s Commissariat of Foreign Affairs of the Belarusian SSR was then established on 24 March that year as a direct result of a resolution passed by the Supreme Soviet. According to this law, the union republics received the right to enter into direct relations with foreign states, conclude agreements with them and exchange diplomatic and consular missions. The structure of the People's Commissariat included the political, protocol and consular departments, the personnel department and the administration of affairs. The staff of the People's Commissariat totaled 27 people. By decree of the Presidium of the Supreme Soviet of Belarus on 26 March 1946, the People's Commissariat was transformed into the Ministry of Foreign Affairs. Exactly 12 years later, the Council of Ministers gave the order for the ministry to represent the BSSR at the United Nations.

Post-Soviet Union
On 19 September 1991, the ministry become known as the Ministry of Foreign Affairs of the Republic of Belarus, effective on this day from a national law adopted at the extraordinary session of the Supreme Soviet. The ministry then became subordinate to the Council of Ministers of the Republic of Belarus. By a decree of President Alexander Lukashenko on 4 December 1998, the ministry was reorganized by abolishing three ministries: foreign affairs, CIS affairs and foreign economic relations. The new most recent regulation on the ministry was approved by decree in July 2006. , the Republic of Belarus maintains diplomatic relations with 164 countries of the world, in 47 of which 60 diplomatic missions are opened. Among them are 45 embassies, 7 permanent missions to international organizations, 7 general consulates and 1 consulate. Twelve branches of the embassies of the Republic of Belarus also operate abroad.

Ministers of Foreign Affairs

Belarusian People's Republic 
 Yazep Varonka 1918
 Anton Lutskevich 1918–20

Belarusian SSR
 Kuzma Kisyalyou 1944–66
 Anatol Hurynovich 1966–90
 Piatro Kravchanka 1990–91

Republic of Belarus          
 Piatro Kravchanka 1991–94
 Uladzimir Syanko 1994–97
 Ivan Antanovich 1997–98
 Ural Latypov 1998–2000
 Mikhail Khvostov 2000–03
 Sergei Martynov 2003–12
 Vladimir Makei 2012–22
 Sergei Aleinik 2022–present

Structure
The structure of the Ministry of Foreign Affairs of the Republic of Belarus as of August 2019:

 Minister of Foreign Affairs (Vacant)
 First Deputy Minister (position vacant)
 General Legal Department
 International Treaty Office
 Department of bilateral treaties
 Department of Multilateral Treaties
 Legal department
 Office of Russia and the Union State
 Department for the Development of Allied Relations
 Department for the implementation of economic programs
 Management of regions of Russia
 Department of the Center, Volga and South of Russia
 Department of the North-West, Urals, Siberia and the Far East
 Office of the Commonwealth of Independent States and the Eurasian Economic Community
 Office of bilateral relations with the countries of the Commonwealth of Independent States
 Office of International Security and Arms Control
 Department of Ukraine, Moldova and Transcaucasia
 Department of Central Asia
 Deputy Minister (Sergey Aleinik)
 Main organizational and control department
 Office of documentation and control
 Department of organizational work
 Department of documentation and control
 Historical and Archival Department
 Office of coordination and planning
 UNESCO Secretariat
 Office of America
 Department of Latin America
US and Canada Division
 Office of Asia and Africa
 Department of Asia
 Department of Africa and the Middle East
 General Directorate of International Diplomacy
 Office of Global Politics and Humanitarian Cooperation
 Office of Economic Cooperation and Sustainable Development
 Deputy Minister 
 European Headquarters
 Bilateral Cooperation Office
 Central Europe Department
 Department of Northern Europe
 Department of Western Europe
 Office of Pan-European Cooperation
 Division of the Organization for Security and Co-operation in Europe and the Council of Europe
 Department of European Integration
 Department of Foreign Policy Analysis
 Information Management
 Press Department
 Information Support Department
 State Protocol Service
 Department of visits
 Department for work with the diplomatic corps
 Protocol Sector
 Main consular department
 Management of analysis, planning, visa and tariff policies
 Consular Legal Department
 Department of Citizenship and Travel Abroad
 Office for Foreigners
 Monetary and financial management
 Department of accounting and reporting of the central office
 Department of financing and reporting of foreign agencies
 Department of methodology and control and audit work
 Department of providing diplomatic services
 Logistics Department
 Department of construction and real estate
 Deputy Minister (Alexander Guryanov)
 Department of Foreign Economic Affairs
 Export Support Office
 Department of export and investment promotion
 Analysis and Planning Department
 Department for work with foreign missions
 Department of Foreign Trade Policy
 Department of protective measures and market access
 Department of customs and tariff regulation and negotiations with the WTO
 Office of Information Technology
 Office of Diplomatic Security
 Security Department
 Special Communications Department
 Security Engineering Department
 HR management
 HR department
 Training Department
 Ambassador on special assignments
 Ambassador-at-Large

See also
Foreign relations of Belarus

References

External links
 Ministry of Foreign Affairs

1991 establishments in Belarus
Foreign Affairs
Foreign relations of Belarus
Belarus